Zhabar i Poshtëm (in Albanian) or Donje Žabare (in Serbian: Доње Жабаре) is a village in the municipality of Mitrovica in the District of Mitrovica, Kosovo. According to the 2011 census, it has 7,394 inhabitants.

Demography
In 2011 census, the village had in total 7,394 inhabitants, from whom 7,355 (99.47%) were Albanians, 17 Bosnians, two Egyptians and five others. Four of them preferred not to answer and 11 were not available.

Notes

References

Villages in Mitrovica, Kosovo